commonly referred to as simply Mitsubishi Yowa or Yowa-kai is a Japanese multisports club based in Sugamo, Tokyo. It is most notable for its football section, also known as Mitsubishi Yowa S.C.. The youth football team is famous for producing many players for the national team, like Kokichi Kimura, Yuichiro Nagai, Yoshizumi Ogawa and Junya Tanaka.

Honours 
 Japan Club Youth Football Cup
 Winners: 1980, 1983, 2014
 U-15 Prince Takamado Cup
 Winners: 1994, 1997

External links 
 

Mitsubishi
Multi-sport clubs in Japan
Football clubs in Japan
Sports clubs established in 1914
Association football clubs established in 1914
Sports teams in Tokyo